Saïda Airport is a public use airport located near Saïda, Saïda Province, Algeria.

See also
List of airports in Algeria

References

External links 
 Airport record for Saïda Airport at Landings.com
 OurAirports - Saïda

Airports in Algeria
Buildings and structures in Saïda Province